Marie-Adélaïde Duvieux , (born Landragin 22 April 1761, Paris - 14 January 1799, Paris) was a French miniaturist painter, active in the 1790s. She participated in several Shows and Parisian art exhibitions between 1791 and 1798.

Life 
She  was baptized on 23 April 1761, in the church of Saint-Laurent, Paris. Her parents, the pensioner Jean-Louis Landragin and his wife Marie Françoise Deschamps, lived in the faubourg Saint-Laurent.

She exhibited at the exhibition of the Society of Friends of the Arts,  organized by art dealer Jean-Baptiste-Pierre Lebrun . She exhibited at the Salon de peinture et de sculpture.

On February 27, 1794, she married  Julien Louis Duvieux.

Her self portrait is in the collections of the National Museum of the Palaces of Versailles and Trianon. Her miniatures are in the collections of the Louvre museum,   at the Albertina, and Bomann-Museum.

Gallery

References 

1761 births
1799 deaths
Portrait miniaturists
18th-century French painters